The 65th German Film Award took place on 19 June 2015, organised by the Deutsche Filmakademie. The award ceremony was held at the Palais am Funkturm in Berlin and broadcast by the ZDF. Jan Josef Liefers hosted the event.

Winners and nominees

Best Fiction Feature Film 

Labyrinth of Lies – Produced by: Uli Putz, Sabine Lamby and Jakob Claussen, directed by: Giulio Ricciarelli
Who Am I – No System Is Safe – Produced by: Max Wiedemann and Quirin Berg, directed by: Baran bo Odar
We Are Young. We Are Strong. – Produced by: Jochen Laube and Leif Alexis, directed by: Burhan Qurbani

Best Documentary Feature Film 
Citizenfour – Produced by: Dirk Wilutzky, Laura Poitras and Mathilde Bonnefoy, directed by: Laura Poitras
Beyond Punishment – Produced and directed by: Hubertus Siegert
Nowitzki. The Perfect Shot – Produced by: Leopold Hoesch, directed by: Sebastian Dehnhardt

Best Children's Feature Film 
The Pasta Detectives – Produced by: Philipp Budweg and Robert Marciniak, directed by: Neele Leana Vollmar
Fiddlesticks – Produced and directed by: Veit Helmer

Best Screenplay 
Stefan Weigl – Age of Cannibals
Elisabeth Bartel and Giulio Ricciarelli – Labyrinth of Lies
Edward Berger and Nele Mueller-Stöfen – Jack
Baran bo Odar and Jantje Friese – Who Am I – No System Is Safe
Ralf Westhoff – Wir sind die Neuen

Best Director 
Sebastian Schipper – Victoria
Edward Berger – Jack
Dominik Graf – Beloved Sisters
Johannes Naber – Age of Cannibals

Best Actress in a Leading Role 
Laia Costa – Victoria
Nina Hoss – Phoenix
Katharina Marie Schubert –

Best Actor in a Leading Role 
Frederick Lau – Victoria
Christian Friedel – 13 Minutes
Hanno Koffler – Tough Love

Best Supporting Actress 
Nina Kunzendorf – Phoenix
Meret Becker – Lügen und andere Wahrheiten
Claudia Messner – Beloved Sisters

Best Supporting Actor 
Joel Basman – We Are Young. We Are Strong.
Burghart Klaußner – 13 Minutes
Gert Voss – Labyrinth of Lies

Best Cinematography 
Sturla Brandth Grøvlen – Victoria
Yoshi Heimrath – We Are Young. We Are Strong.
Judith Kaufmann – 13 Minutes
Nikolaus Summerer – Who Am I – No System Is Safe

Best Editing 
Robert Rzesacz – Who Am I – No System Is Safe
Mathilde Bonnefoy – Citizenfour
Sven Budelmann – Stereo
Alexander Dittner – 13 Minutes
Jörg Hauschild – As We Were Dreaming

Best Set Design 
Silke Buhr – Who Am I – No System Is Safe
Benedikt Herforth and Thomas Stammer – 13 Minutes
Claus Jürgen Pfeiffer – Beloved Sisters

Best Costume Design 
Barbara Grupp – Beloved Sisters
Katrin Aschendorf – The Cut
Bettina Marx – 13 Minutes

Best Make Up 
Nannie Gebhardt-Seele and Tatjana Krauskopf – Beloved Sisters
Tatjana Krauskopf and Isabelle Neu – 13 Minutes
Waldemar Pokromski and Sabine Schumann – The Cut

Best Film Music 
Nils Frahm – Victoria
Alexander Hacke – The Cut
Niki Reiser and Sebastian Pille – Labyrinth of Lies

Best Sound Design 
Bernhard Joest-Däberitz, Florian Beck, Ansgar Frerich and Daniel Weis – Who Am I – No System Is Safe
Frank Kruse, Matthias Lempert and Alexander Buck – Citizenfour
Magnus Pflüger, Fabian Schmidt and Matthias Lempert – Victoria

Lifetime Achievement Award 
Barbara Baum

Most Visited Film 
Honig im Kopf – Produced by: Til Schweiger and Tom Zickler, directed by: Til Schweiger

References

 
 

2015 film awards
2015 in German cinema
2015